I Can't Get Started is a 1985 Australian film about a man who writes a successful novel.

References

External links

I Can't Get Started at Peter Malone

Australian drama films
1985 films
1980s English-language films
1980s Australian films